

Champions

Major League Baseball
World Series: Oakland Athletics over New York Mets (4–3); Reggie Jackson, MVP

All-Star Game, July 24 at Royals Stadium: National League, 7–1; Bobby Bonds, MVP

Other champions
College World Series: USC
Japan Series: Yomiuri Giants over Nankai Hawks (4–1)
Big League World Series: Lincolnwood, Illinois
Little League World Series: Tainan City, Taiwan
Senior League World Series: Taipei, Taiwan
Winter Leagues
1973 Caribbean Series: Tigres del Licey
Dominican Republic League: Tigres del Licey
Mexican Pacific League: Yaquis de Obregón
Puerto Rican League: Cangrejeros de Santurce
Venezuelan League: Leones del Caracas

Awards and honors
Baseball Hall of Fame
Roberto Clemente
Billy Evans
Monte Irvin
George Kelly
Warren Spahn
Mickey Welch
Most Valuable Player
Reggie Jackson (AL) Oakland Athletics
Pete Rose (NL) Cincinnati Reds
Cy Young Award
Jim Palmer (AL) Baltimore Orioles
Tom Seaver (NL) New York Mets
Rookie of the Year
Al Bumbry (AL) Baltimore Orioles
Gary Matthews (NL) San Francisco Giants

MLB statistical leaders

1 Modern single season strikeout record.

Major league baseball final standings

American League final standings

National League final standings

Events

January–March
January 3 – A group of investors, headed by shipbuilder George Steinbrenner, purchases the New York Yankees from CBS for $10 million.
January 11 – Major League Baseball owners vote in approval of the American League adopting the designated hitter position.
January 18 – Orlando Cepeda signs with the Boston Red Sox, making him the first player signed by a team as a designated hitter.
January 24 – Left-handed pitcher Warren Spahn is elected to the Hall of Fame in his first try on the Baseball Writers' Association of America ballot, receiving 316 of 380 votes.
January 28 – The Hall of Fame Special Veterans Committee selects 19th-century pitcher Mickey Welch and Giants first baseman George Kelly, plus umpire Billy Evans, for enshrinement.
February 1 – Commissioner Bowie Kuhn announces the selection of Monte Irvin for the Hall of Fame by the Special Committee on the Negro Leagues.
February 27 – Chicago White Sox slugger Dick Allen signs a three-year contract for an estimated $250,000 per year, making him the highest-paid player in major league history.
March 5 – New York Yankees teammates Fritz Peterson and Mike Kekich arrive at Spring training and announce that wives and families have been swapped. Even the family dogs were traded.
March 20 – In a special election held by the Baseball Writers' Association of America, the late Roberto Clemente receives 393 of 424 votes to earn entry into the Hall of Fame. The Hall's Board of Directors had earlier waived the five-year-wait rule for Clemente.
March 24 – The Cleveland Indians trade catcher Ray Fosse and infielder Jack Heidemann to the Oakland Athletics for Dave Duncan and George Hendrick.
March 26 – Denny McLain, who'd in 1968, won 31 games for the Detroit Tigers, becoming the last MLB pitcher to win 30 games, is released by the Atlanta Braves. McLain never pitches in the major leagues again.
March 29 – Orange baseballs, the brainchild of Oakland Athletics owner Charlie Finley, are used in the Athletics' 11–5 exhibition loss to the Cleveland Indians.

April–June
April 6:
At Three Rivers Stadium, 51,695 fans watch as the jersey #21 of the late Roberto Clemente is retired. The Pittsburgh Pirates then beat the St. Louis Cardinals 7–5, with a ninth-inning rally.
At Fenway Park, Ron Blomberg of the New York Yankees becomes the first designated hitter in major league history. He is walked by Boston Red Sox pitcher Luis Tiant in his first plate appearance.
At Oakland–Alameda County Coliseum, Tony Oliva of the Minnesota Twins becomes the first designated hitter to homer, with a first-inning shot off Catfish Hunter.
April 10 – The Kansas City Royals open their new park, Royals Stadium, with a 12–1 rout of the Texas Rangers. The game is attended by 39,464 fans braving 39-degree weather.
April 17 – Philadelphia Phillies pitcher Dick Ruthven, signed from Fresno State, makes his major league debut without ever playing in the minor leagues. He starts against the Montreal Expos, allowing four runs in less than two innings, but did not figure in the decision as the Phillies won 9-6.
April 27 – In 50-degree weather, Kansas City Royals rookie Steve Busby no-hits the host Detroit Tigers 3–0. With the designated hitter rule in effect, Busby becomes the first pitcher of a no-hitter to not come to bat.
May 8:
For the second time in his career, Willie Stargell of the Pittsburgh Pirates hits a home run out of Dodger Stadium. His blast off Andy Messersmith hits the right field pavilion roof 470 feet away. His first home run, a 506-foot shot, came off Alan Foster on August 5, . The Los Angeles Dodgers win, 7–4.
In a 9–7 losing effort against the San Francisco Giants, St. Louis Cardinals ace Bob Gibson makes his 242nd consecutive start. It is a new 20th-century record, passing that of Red Ruffing who never pitched in relief the last ten years of his career.
May 9 – Johnny Bench of the Cincinnati Reds hit three home runs off Philadelphia's Steve Carlton for the second time in his career, in a 9–7 victory. Bench drove in seven runs.
May 15 – Nolan Ryan of the California Angels pitches the first of his seven career no hitters, defeating the Kansas City Royals, 3–0.
May 19 – The Atlanta Braves trade Andre Thornton to the Chicago Cubs in exchange for Joe Pepitone.
May 24 – Willie Davis of the Los Angeles Dodgers gets 6 hits, all singles in a 7-3 19 inning loss to the New York Mets at Dodger Stadium. The record still stands as of 2017 for most hits in a game by a Dodgers player.
June 7 – Dave Winfield of the University of Minnesota, the fourth pick in the June 1973 Major League Baseball draft, will go straight to the major leagues with the San Diego Padres. The Milwaukee Brewers use their third overall pick to select Robin Yount.
June 9 – After the Old Timers' Game at Shea Stadium, Willie Mays puts on his own show with a home run and a circus catch, and the New York Mets top the Los Angeles Dodgers 4–2. For Mays, older than a half dozen of the old Mets, it is the 655th homer of his career. Rusty Staub drives in two runs to back Jon Matlack. In the Old Timers' Game, the Brooklyn Dodgers/New York Yankees team loses to the Mets 1–0 in two innings.
June 13 – At Riverfront Stadium, St. Louis Cardinals pitcher Rick Wise loses a no-hitter when the Cincinnati Reds' Joe Morgan singles with one out in the ninth inning. It will be the only hit Wise allows in an 8–0 shutout win.
June 19
In a Dodgers 4–0 victory over Cincinnati, Pete Rose (single) and Willie Davis (HR) each collect their 2,000th career hit.
Dave Winfield debuts in a San Diego Padre 7-3 loss to the Houston Astros.  Winfield—who was also drafted by the Minnesota Vikings of the NFL and basketball's Atlanta Hawks (NBA) and Utah Stars (ABA) -- would go 1 for 4 in his debut, and never spend a day in the minor leagues.  After a 22-year career, he is voted into baseball's Hall of Fame.
June 20
Cy Acosta of the Chicago White Sox becomes the first American League pitcher to bat since the DH rule went into effect. Acosta strikes out in the eighth inning, but is credited with an 8–3 victory over the California Angels.
Bobby Bonds leads off with a home run, but the Giants lose 7–5 to Cincinnati. It is Bonds' 22nd leadoff home run, breaking Lou Brock's National League record.
June 23 – Pitcher Ken Brett of the Philadelphia Phillies tops the Montreal Expos 7–2, and hits a home run for his fourth consecutive game, setting a major league record. Previously, Brett hit home runs on June 9, 13, and 18. He will total 10 for his career.
June 28 – Willie Stargell hits his 300th career home run helping the Pittsburgh Pirates beat the St. Louis Cardinals 6–0.

July
July 1 – Luis Aparicio of the Boston Red Sox steals the 500th base of his career in a 9–5 loss to the Milwaukee Brewers. It is the highest total in the American League since Eddie Collins retired in 1930.
July 2 – The Detroit Tigers sign undrafted free agent Ron LeFlore.
July 3 – Brothers Gaylord Perry (Indians) and Jim Perry (Tigers) pitch against each other for the only time in their careers. Neither finishes the game, but Gaylord is charged with the 5–4 loss. Two Norm Cash home runs help the Tigers.
July 4 – The Minnesota Twins bring their first-round June draft pick, pitcher Eddie Bane, straight to the major leagues, in an attempt to boost interest and attendance (the brainchild of owner Calvin Griffith).  Bane brings a 40-4 record with him from Arizona State University, and goes seven innings in his debut, a no-decision start. A crowd of 45,890 is on hand at Metropolitan Stadium. 
July 9 – In a record-setting walkathon between the Cincinnati Reds and Montreal Expos, 25 bases on balls are handed out as Montreal strolls to an 11–6 win. Well off the American League's two-team mark of 30, this tops the National League record of 23, last reached on July 7, 1911. Six Montreal pitchers walk 16, one short of the record for an NL team, while two Reds pitchers walk nine. Hal King pinch hits a grand slam for the Reds in the 6th inning, his second pinch homer in nine days.
July 11:
Jim Northrup, batting leadoff for the Detroit Tigers, drives in eight runs in a 14–2 win over Texas.
In San Diego, the Pittsburgh Pirates drub the Padres 10–2. Willie Stargell contributes the 302nd home run of his career to pass Ralph Kiner as the all-time Pirate home run leader.
The New York Mets sell Jim Fregosi to The Texas Rangers.
July 15:
Willie McCovey hits his 400th career home run helping San Francisco Giants beat Pittsburgh Pirates 12–0.
Nolan Ryan pitches his second no hitter of the season (and second of seven for his career.  He strikes out seventeen Detroit Tigers as the Angels win, 6–0.
July 20 – Wilbur Wood starts both games of a doubleheader for the Chicago White Sox, and loses both games to the New York Yankees, 12–2 & 7–0.
July 21 – Hank Aaron of the Atlanta Braves hits a Ken Brett fastball into the left-center field stands for a two-run home run during an 8–4 loss to the Philadelphia Phillies. It is career home run #700 for Aaron, only the second player to reach that milestone. Babe Ruth, with 714, is the other.
July 24 – The National League wins the All-Star Game at Kansas City, 7–1. A record 54 players are used, including Willie Mays, who strikes out in his final All-Star appearance, and Catfish Hunter, who sustains a fractured thumb that will sideline him for four weeks. Hunter has a 15–3 record at the time. Johnny Bench, Bobby Bonds, and Willie Davis all hit home runs for the N.L. and Bonds edged out Willie Davis for the game MVP by 1 vote.
July 30 – At Oakland–Alameda County Coliseum, Jim Bibby of the Texas Rangers no-hits the Oakland Athletics 6–0. The no-hitter is the first in the history of the Washington Senators/Texas Rangers franchise.

August
August 1 – With the score tied at 2–2 in the top of the ninth at Fenway Park, in an incident that typifies both the Yankees – Red Sox rivalry and the feud between the two catchers involved, Thurman Munson of the New York Yankees barrels into Carlton Fisk of the Boston Red Sox while trying to score on Gene Michael's missed squeeze attempt. The incident triggers a 10-minute bench-clearing brawl in which both catchers are ejected. The Red Sox win 3–2 in the bottom of the ninth, with Mario Guerrero's two-out single scoring Bob Montgomery (who had replaced the ejected Fisk) for the winning run.
August 5 – Atlanta Braves knuckleballer Phil Niekro no-hits the San Diego Padres 9–0. He walks three and strikes out four in recording the first no-hitter by the franchise in Atlanta.
August 6 – An exhibition game between the Milwaukee Brewers and the Atlanta Braves held at Milwaukee draws 33,337. The Brewers win, 7–5, in the fourth and last exhibition between the two teams. But the big thrill is provided by Hank Aaron, who hits a home run.
August 7 – Two days after Phil Niekro's no-hitter, the Braves purchase Joe Niekro, Phil's pitching brother, from the Detroit Tigers.
August 11 – Chicago White Sox rookie Brian Downing cracks his first major league hit, a home run off Detroit's Mickey Lolich. Downing's debut dinger is a first in the majors since at least 1945 – an inside-the-park homer. It'll be matched in two years by the Giants Johnnie LeMaster, who will do it in his first at-bat.
August 15 – In Pittsburgh, Cincinnati Reds ace Jack Billingham beats the host Pittsburgh Pirates 1–0, notching his seventh shutout of the season. This ties the club record set by Hod Eller back in 1919.
August 17 – The New York Mets' Willie Mays hits the 660th (and last) home run of his career off Don Gullett of Cincinnati, but the Reds win 2–1 in 10 innings at Shea Stadium, after pinch hitter Hal King bats a walk-off home run, his third pinch homer of the year.
August 21 – Against the Cleveland Indians at Cleveland Stadium, Stan Bahnsen of the Chicago White Sox has a no-hitter broken up with two out in the ninth on a single by ex-teammate Walt Williams. The hit is the only one Bahnsen allows as the White Sox defeat the Indians 4-0.
August 27 - Detroit Tigers manager Billy Martin was fired with one year left on a reported $65,000 annual contract.

September
September 3 – The San Francisco Giants overcome a  7 – 1 deficit to beat the Los Angeles Dodgers 11 – 8 at Candlestick Park during a nationally televised Monday Night baseball game on NBC.  Bobby Bonds hit a walk-off grand slam into the right field seats to win the game for the Giants.
September 6 – Brothers Felipe Alou and Matty Alou are released by the New York Yankees. Felipe is sold to the Montreal Expos and Matty goes to the St. Louis Cardinals.
September 7 – Future Hall of Fame pilot Whitey Herzog is fired from his first MLB managerial assignment by the Texas Rangers with the club in the American League West cellar at 47-91. Del Wilber serves as interim manager for one game before owner Bob Short names Billy Martin, fired by the Tigers only ten days earlier, as Herzog's permanent replacement. 
September 17 – The Montreal Expos achieved something they never done before. first place this late in the season and they did in Game 1 of a doubleheader they beat the St. Louis Cardinals on a 9th inning rally scoring 2 runs in the 9th 5-4. But they lost first place in Game 2 as they lose to the Cards in 12 innings.
September 19 – The Pittsburgh Pirates lose the first game of a crucial three-game series at Shea for first place 7–3 to the New York Mets when Cleon Jones has just the second two home run performance of his career (the first time was on April 6, in the season opener against the Philadelphia Phillies).
September 20 – At Shea Stadium, in the top of the thirteenth inning, with Richie Zisk on first, the Pittsburgh Pirates' Dave Augustine belts what appears to be a home run over the left field wall. New York Mets left fielder Cleon Jones turns to play the ball off the wall and the ball hits the top of the wall and goes right into Jones' glove on the fly. He turns and throws to relay man Wayne Garrett, who throws home to catcher Ron Hodges to nail Zisk at the plate. Following the "Ball on the Wall" play, the Mets win the game in the bottom half of the inning to move within half a game of the first place Pirates.
September 27 – Capping a memorable season, Nolan Ryan strikes out 16 Minnesota Twins en route to a 5–4, 11-inning win for the California Angels.  Rich Reese is Ryan's final strikeout, his 383rd of the season, which breaks Sandy Koufax's season record.
September 30:
The New York Yankees play their final game in the original Yankee Stadium, losing to the Detroit Tigers 8–5. Yankee Stadium remains closed until 1976 while undergoing major renovations.
After 11 years at the helm (944–806 .539), Ralph Houk resigns as the New York Yankees' manager. The 'Major' will manage the Detroit Tigers next season.

October–December
October 1 – Two make-up games were played after the scheduled end of the regular season on September 30: the Mets won at the Cubs 6–4 and the Pirates lost at home to the Padres 3–4; making a potential second game between the Cubs and Mets unnecessary.
October 8 – In Game 3 of the National League Championship Series, the New York Mets' Rusty Staub homers in the first and second innings as the Mets crush the Cincinnati Reds 9–2 at New York's Shea Stadium, in a game featuring a bench-clearing brawl involving future Phillies teammates Pete Rose and Bud Harrelson.
October 10 – Like , no one thought the Mets would win the National League pennant, but they amazingly did as New York's Tom Seaver hurls the Mets into the World Series with a 7–2 victory over the Reds in Game 5 of the 1973 National League Championship Series. New York has 13 hits in the contest.
October 13 – The Oakland Athletics score two unearned runs in the third inning of game one of the 1973 World Series when the usually sure handed Félix Millán allows a ground ball to go through his legs. They are the only runs New York Mets starter Jon Matlack allows, but they are enough to give Oakland the 2–1 game one victory.
October 14 – In one of the more bizarre games in World Series history, the Mets defeat the Athletics 10-7 in 12 innings in Game 2 by scoring four runs in the 12th, three of which were the result of two errors by Oakland second baseman Mike Andrews.  After the game, Athletics owner Charlie O. Finley forced Andrews to sign a false affidavit stating he was disabled, which would have rendered him ineligible for the remainder of the series.  A's manager Dick Williams rallied to Andrews' defense and commissioner Bowie Kuhn nullified the affidavit. Nevertheless, Finley ordered Williams to bench Andrews for the remainder of the series. Williams, in defiance, sent Andrews to the plate as a pinch hitter in Game 4 in New York three nights later as the Mets' home crowd gave a standing ovation.
October 21 – Bert Campaneris and Reggie Jackson hit two-run home runs in the third inning as the Oakland Athletics defeated the New York Mets, 5–2, in Game Seven of the World Series, for their second straight World Championship. Jackson is selected the Series MVP.
October 23 – Athletics owner Charlie Finley reveals that he will not release manager Dick Williams from his contract unless he receives adequate compensation from the team that signs him. Williams had resigned following the World Series victory two days earlier.
November 27 – San Francisco Giants left fielder Gary Matthews, who hit .300 with 12 home runs and 58 RBI in 145 games, outpolls eight others receiving 11 of 24 nominations for the National League Rookie of the Year Award. The runners-up are Steve Rogers (P), Bob Boone (C), Dan Driessen (3B), Elías Sosa (P), Ron Cey (3B), Johnny Grubb (CF), Davey Lopes (2B) and Richie Zisk (RF).
December 6 – The Houston Astros trade Jimmy Wynn to the Los Angeles Dodgers in exchange for Claude Osteen and minor league pitcher David Culpepper.
December 7 – The New York Yankees trade pitcher Lindy McDaniel to the Kansas City Royals in exchange for pitcher Ken Wright and outfielder Lou Piniella.

Movies
Bang the Drum Slowly

Births

January
January 2 – Mike Metcalfe
January 3 – Da Rond Stovall
January 5 – Fred Rath Jr.
January 5 – Ramón Tatís
January 8 – Mike Cameron
January 9 – Aaron Holbert
January 10 – Gary Rath
January 14 – Troy Brohawn
January 14 – Rod Myers
January 15 – Chris Cumberland
January 15 – Wayne Gomes
January 18 - Joe Kehoskie
January 19 – Chris Stynes
January 20 – Julio Santana
January 23 – Nelson Paulino
January 24 – Mike Glavine
January 25 – Terrell Wade
January 28 – Jacob Cruz
January 29 – Brian Edmondson
January 29 – Jason Schmidt
January 30 – Bob Henley

February
February 3 – Ryan Long
February 4 – Chris Coste
February 8 – Keith McDonald
February 14 – Daniel Garibay
February 18 – Shawn Estes
February 22 – Rick Heiserman
February 22 – Russ Johnson
February 23 – Jason Boyd
February 24 – Stubby Clapp

March
March 4 – Brian Barber
March 4 – Rick Eckstein
March 5 – Felipe Crespo
March 5 – Ryan Franklin
March 6 – Terry Adams
March 6 – Roberto Durán
March 8 – Mark Lukasiewicz
March 8 – Justin Thompson
March 9 – Aaron Boone
March 9 – C. J. Nitkowski
March 12 – David Lee
March 13 – Darío Veras
March 14 – Robert Dodd
March 17 – Vance Wilson
March 18 – Raúl Chávez
March 23 – Ramón Ortiz
March 28 – Paul Wilson
March 30 – Jason Dickson

April
April 2 – Marc Kroon
April 7 – Brett Tomko
April 8 – Alex S. Gonzalez
April 12 – Antonio Osuna
April 17 – Andy Barkett
April 18 – Brady Clark
April 19 – Heath Murray
April 19 – Willis Otáñez
April 20 – Todd Hollandsworth
April 20 – Scott Winchester
April 21 – Kevin Brown
April 26 – Geoff Blum

May
May 1 – Rich Butler
May 6 – Izzy Alcántara
May 6 – Mike Kinkade
May 14 – Brad Rigby
May 14 – Anthony Shumaker
May 21 – Tommy Davis
May 22 – Julián Tavárez
May 23 – Ramón Ortiz
May 24 – Bartolo Colón
May 25 – Mel Rosario
May 25 – Todd Walker
May 26 – Chris Latham
May 29 – Trever Miller
May 31 – Marty Janzen

June
June 1 – Derek Lowe
June 2 – Neifi Pérez
June 3 – Robert Machado
June 4 – David Lundquist
June 10 – Julio Mañón
June 10 – Pokey Reese
June 19 – Yasuhiko Yabuta
June 20 – Rickey Cradle
June 24 – Kevin Hodges
June 24 – Ryan Nye
June 24 – Rob Ryan
June 28 – Jose Flores
June 28 – Corey Koskie
June 29 – Jason Rakers
June 29 – Pedro Valdés
June 30 – Chan Ho Park

July
July 4 – Jay Canizaro
July 7 – José Jiménez
July 7 – Matt Mantei
July 18 – Antone Williamson
July 19 – Alex Pacheco
July 21 – Brian Buchanan
July 22 – Mike Sweeney
July 22 – Mike Thurman
July 23 – Nomar Garciaparra
July 24 – Stephen Larkin
July 24 – Norihiro Nakamura
July 25 – Guillermo Mota
July 27 – Enrique Wilson

August
August 2 – Mike Venafro
August 3 – Blake Stein
August 4 – Bob Howry
August 4 – Eric Weaver
August 7 – Danny Graves
August 9 – Juan Alvarez
August 12 – Gene Stechschulte
August 16 – Damian Jackson
August 17 – Adam Butler
August 19 – Britt Reames
August 20 – Todd Helton
August 20 – José Paniagua
August 21 – Mike Bovee
August 21 – Lou Collier
August 21 – Ismael Valdéz
August 22 – Dusty Wathan
August 23 – Casey Blake
August 23 – Anthony Iapoce
August 24 – Arquimedez Pozo
August 25 – Dante Powell
August 26 – Mark Budzinski
August 27 – Rick Gorecki
August 28 – Kit Pellow

September
September 4 – Joe DePastino
September 4 – Aaron Fultz
September 4 – Brian Simmons
September 5 – Justin Atchley
September 7 – David Newhan
September 7 – Jarrod Patterson
September 8 – Bob Wolcott
September 9 – Kazuhisa Ishii
September 10 – Mike Saipe
September 11 – Tom Davey
September 14 – Joe Winkelsas
September 16 – Desi Relaford
September 18 – Mitch Meluskey
September 24 – Jesse Garcia
September 24 – Carlton Loewer

October

October 1 – John Thomson
October 2 – Scott Schoeneweis
October 3 – Brandon Hyde
October 3 – Kerry Robinson
October 5 – Brett Laxton
October 5 – Luis Lopez
October 9 – Bill Pulsipher
October 10 – Brian Powell
October 11 – Dmitri Young
October 12 – Lesli Brea
October 15 – David Cortés
October 15 – Mendy López
October 15 – Tim Young
October 21 – Bryan Corey
October 22 – Ichiro Suzuki
October 24 – Mike Matthews
October 25 – Michihiro Ogasawara
October 27 – Jason Johnson
October 31 – Tim Byrdak
October 31 – David Dellucci

November
November 5 – Johnny Damon
November 6 – Carlos Almanzar
November 6 – Justin Speier
November 7 – Sean DePaula
November 8 – Edgardo Alfonzo
November 12 – J. D. Smart
November 13 – Jason Simontacchi
November 14 – Rubén Rivera
November 15 – Brian Dallimore
November 15 – Kevin Gryboski
November 17 – Mickey Lopez
November 17 – Eli Marrero
November 20 – Brandon Kolb
November 21 – Todd Erdos
November 21 – Dan Murray
November 22 – Ricky Ledée
November 25 – Octavio Dotel
November 27 – Jason Beverlin

December
December 3 – Robert Ramsay
December 5 – Hanley Frías
December 7 – Brian Schmack
December 8 – Jeff DaVanon
December 9 – Tony Batista
December 9 – Chris Truby
December 11 – Andy Tracy
December 19 – José Silva
December 25 – Tarrik Brock
December 26 – Nobuhiko Matsunaka
December 27 – Raúl González
December 29 – Theo Epstein
December 29 – Tomás Pérez
December 30 – Ralph Milliard

Deaths

January
January 3 – Donald Reeves, 61, All-Star outfielder and 1938 Negro American League batting champion (.384) whose pro baseball career extended from 1937 to 1941; became a teacher after retiring from the game.
January 9 – Al Cypert, 83, third baseman who played one game for the Cleveland Naps on June 27, 1914; later a lawyer and politician in his native Arkansas.
January 9 – Lyn Lary, 66, shortstop for seven MLB teams who led the American League in steals in 1936; member of 1932 World Series champion New York Yankees.
January 11 – Rivington Bisland, 82, shortstop who appeared in 31 games over three seasons (1912–1914) for the Pittburgh Pirates, St. Louis Browns and Cleveland Naps.
January 22 – Al Halt, 82, third baseman/shortstop who played in 257 games for the 1914–1915 Brooklyn Tip-Tops of the Federal League (then labeled an "outlaw" circuit) and 1917 Cleveland Indians.
January 23 – Ray Callahan, 81, left-hander who pitched in three games for the Cincinnati Reds in September 1915.
January 28 – Thad Christopher, 60, who played seven seasons spanning 1936 to 1945 in the Negro leagues, primarily as an outfielder.
January 29 – Bob Madison, 61, outfielder who played for the Kansas City Monarchs during their "barnstorming" era (1935–1936), then the 1937–1938 Memphis Red Sox and 1942 Birmingham Black Barons of the Negro American League.
January 30 – Scotty Alcock, 87, third baseman in 54 games for the 1914 Chicago White Sox.

February
February 8 – Roy Spencer, 72, catcher in 636 games, the bulk of them as a member of the Washington Senators (1929–1932), over a dozen seasons between 1925 and 1938.
February 14 – Paul Johnson, 76, outfielder/pinch hitter who played in 66 games for the 1920–1921 Philadelphia Athletics.
February 21 – Gilly Campbell, 65, lefty-swinging catcher who appeared in 295 games over five seasons for the Chicago Cubs, Cincinnati Reds and Brooklyn Dodgers between 1933 and 1938.
February 28 – Syl Simon, 75, infielder and pinch hitter for the 1923–1924 St. Louis Browns who played in the minor leagues after losing much of his left hand in an accident.

March
March 1 – Ray Battle, 54, third baseman for the 1944–1945 Homestead Grays of the Negro National League.
March 11 – Ralph Shropshire, 62, catcher who played ten games for the 1937 St. Louis Stars of the Negro American League.
March 12 – Jesse Altenburg, 80, outfielder who appeared in 19 games for the 1916–1917 Pittsburgh Pirates.
March 12 – Frankie Frisch, 74, Hall of Fame second baseman for the New York Giants (1919–1926) and St. Louis Cardinals (1927–1937) who scored 100 runs seven times, led the NL in steals three times, and was the 1931 MVP; a lifetime .316 hitter, he twice batted .400 in the World Series; managed the "Gas House Gang" Cardinals to the 1934 World Series title and overall a four-time world champion as player and playing manager; helmed the Cardinals (July 25, 1933 to September 11, 1938), Pirates (1940–1946) and Chicago Cubs (June 14, 1949 to July 21, 1951); in broadcasting, he was a radio play-by-play man in Boston for the Bees and Red Sox (1939) and New York for the Giants (1947–1948), a member of the Giants' TV team in the mid-1950s, and a color man on the CBS-TV Game of the Week from 1959 to 1961.
March 19 – Walt Leverenz, 84, pitcher for the St. Louis Browns from 1913 to 1915.
March 22 – Bill McCorry, 85, pitcher who worked in only two games for 1909 Browns, but went on to a long baseball career, spending almost 30 years in the minors as a player and player-manager, then serving as longtime traveling secretary of the New York Yankees.
March 26 – George Sisler, 80, Hall of Fame first baseman for the St. Louis Browns (1915–1922, 1924–1927) who was widely recognized as the best defensive player ever at that position, twice batted over .400, and hit .340 lifetime; the American League's 1922 MVP, he had a record 257 hits in 1920 and also led the league in steals four times; managed Browns from 1924 to 1926, and later served as trusted assistant to general manager Branch Rickey in Brooklyn and Pittsburgh; sons Dick and Dave had noteworthy major-league careers.
March 28 – Cap Tyson, 70, catcher who played for the Birmingham Black Barons of the Negro American League between 1938 and 1941.

April
April 5 – Tex Jeanes, 72, outfielder who played in 53 games during five brief MLB trials with the 1921–1922 Cleveland Indians, 1925–1926 Washington Senators and 1927 New York Giants; nephew of Tris Speaker.
April 6 – Ernie Smith, 73, New Jersey native known as the "Kansas City Kid" for his minor-league exploits; shortstop in 24 games for 1930 Chicago White Sox.
April 11 – George Minor, 53, outfielder who played for the Chicago American Giants and Cleveland Buckeyes of the Negro American League between 1944 and 1948.
April 13 – Clarence Blethen, 79, pitcher for the Boston Red Sox and Brooklyn Dodgers between 1923 and 1929.
April 17 – Vic Aldridge, 79, pitcher for the Chicago Cubs (1917–1918, 1922–1924), Pittsburgh Pirates (1925–1927) and New York Giants (1928); helped Pittsburgh win two pennants in three years; his two complete-game wins over Washington were crucial to Pirates' 1925 World Series title; two years later, absorbed a 6–2 defeat at the hands of the "Murderer's Row" New York Yankees in Game 2 of Yanks' 1927 four-game sweep.
April 30 – Bill McColgan, 47, play-by-play announcer who, while best known for describing NFL action, was a member of the Cleveland Indians' broadcast team from 1958 to 1960.

May
May 1 – Bobby Reis, 64, pitcher, outfielder and pinch hitter who got into 175 career games (69 as a pitcher) for the Brooklyn Dodgers and Boston Bees between 1935 and 1938; led National League in games finished in 1936.
May 5 – Bert Griffith, 77, outfielder in 191 career games for 1921–1923 Brooklyn Robins and 1924 Washington Senators.
May 7 – Ralph Miller, 100, pitcher who posted a 5–17 (5.15 ERA) record in 29 games for Brooklyn and Baltimore of the National League in 1898 and 1899; first centenarian among MLB players.
May 18 – Herb Kelly, 80, southpaw who pitched in ten games for the 1914–1915 Pittsburgh Pirates.
May 19 – Jim Moore, 69, pitcher who played from 1928 to 1932 for the Cleveland Indians and Chicago White Sox.
May 21 – Herm Wehmeier, 46, pitcher who won 92 games in 13 seasons from 1945 to 1958, primarily spent with the Cincinnati Reds.
May 23 – Neil Mahoney, 66, former Northeastern University catcher and Bowdoin College head baseball coach who became chief East Coast scout and then director of player procurement and development of the Boston Red Sox from 1946 until his death.
May 26 – Nelson "Chicken" Hawks, 77, first baseman/outfielder who played in 146 career games for 1921 New York Yankees and 1925 Philadelphia Phillies.
May 30 – Jim Breton, 81, third baseman who appeared in 109 games for the 1913–1915 Chicago White Sox.

June
June 1 – Fred Heimach, 72, southpaw hurler who appeared in 296 career games for 1920–1926 Philadelphia Athletics, 1926 Boston Red Sox, 1928–1929 New York Yankees, and 1930–1933 Brooklyn Robins/Dodgers; member of 1928 world-champion Yankees.
June 2 – King Bader, 85, pitcher for the 1912 New York Giants and 1917–1918 Boston Red Sox.
June 3 – Jack Mills, 83, Harvard-educated third baseman and pinch runner who played in 13 games for the 1911 Cleveland Naps.
June 11 – Bill Burwell, 78, pitcher for the St. Louis Browns in 1920–1921 and Pittsburgh Pirates in 1928; longtime minor-league manager and scout; served two terms as a Pittsburgh coach, including as pitching tutor for 1960 World Series champions.
June 11 – Tom Padden, 64, catcher in 399 games for three MLB clubs, almost exclusively the 1932–1937 Pirates, over all or part of seven seasons.
June 11 – Kemp Wicker, 66, left-handed pitcher for 1936–1938 New York Yankees and 1941 Brooklyn Dodgers; minor-league manager and longtime scout; member of 1937 World Series champions.
June 12 – Irv Bartling, 58, infielder who played 14 games for the 1938 Philadelphia Athletics.
June 12 – Clint Blume, 74, pitcher who appeared in 13 games during trials with the 1922 and 1923 New York Giants.
June 14 – Fred Johnson, 79, pitcher whose 21-year professional baseball career (1921–1941) included 27 MLB games pitched for the 1922–1923 New York Giants, then, at the ages of 44 and 45, the 1938–1939 St. Louis Browns.
June 17 – Fritz Scheeren, 81, outfielder who appeared in 15 games during two trials with the Pittsburgh Pirates (1914–1915).
June 18 – Gerves Fagan, 57, infielder for five Negro leagues teams during 1942 and 1943.
June 23 – Cliff Aberson, 51,  two-sport athlete who was a left fielder for the Chicago  Cubs from 1947 to 1949, and a halfback with Green Bay Packers in 1945.
June 30 – Doc Cook, 87, New York Yankees' outfielder who appeared in 288 games from 1913 to 1916.
June 30 – Bunny Downs, 79, infielder (1914–1929) for ten Black baseball and Negro leagues clubs; later, manager of the 1943 Cincinnati Clowns of the Negro American League.

July
July 2 – Chick Hafey, 70, Hall of Fame left fielder for the St. Louis Cardinals and Cincinnati Reds, a career .316 hitter who made the first hit in All-Star history and was the first batting champion to wear eyeglasses.
July 2 – George McBride, 92, shortstop who played primarily for the Washington Senators (1908–1920) and known for his defense; managed Senators in 1921.
July 4 – Walter Schmidt, 86, catcher who played in 766 games over ten seasons for the Pittsburgh Pirates (1916–1924) and St. Louis Cardinals (1925).
July 6 – Joe E. Brown, 81, comedian, actor (Some Like It Hot, the baseball-themed films Alibi Ike and Fireman, Save My Child, and dozens of others) and passionate fan who spent the 1953 season on the Yankees' play-by-play broadcast team; his son Joe L. was the longtime general manager of the Pittsburgh Pirates.
July 6 – Wickey McAvoy, 78, catcher who played in 235 games for the Philadelphia Athletics (1913–1915, 1917–1919).
July 7 – Paul Musser, 84, pitcher for the Washington Senators (1912) and Boston Red Sox (1919).
July 11 – George Edmondson, 77, pitcher who worked in a total of eight games for 1922–1924 Cleveland Indians.
July 12 – Billy Urbanski, 70, shortstop for the Boston Braves from 1931 to 1936.
July 17 – Evar Swanson, 70, outfielder for the Cincinnati Reds (1929–1930) and Chicago White Sox (1932–1934); swiped 33 bases in 1929—but caught stealing 20 times, which led the National League.

August
August 7 – Wilbur Cooper, 81, first left-handed pitcher in National League history to win over 200 games (with 216 career triumphs); won 202 games for the Pittsburgh Pirates between 1912 and 1924.
August 13 – Alva Jo Fischer, 46, All-American Girls Professional Baseball League pitcher and shortstop who earned inductions into several baseball halls of fame.
August 13 – Ernest Smith, 73, outfielder/catcher who played in the Negro leagues between 1937 and 1942.
August 14 – Claude Willoughby, 74, pitcher who spent all but nine games of his 219-game MLB career as a member of terrible Philadelphia Phillies teams (1925–1930).
August 21 – Ira Hutchinson, 62, pitcher who appeared in 209 games for four MLB clubs, principally the Boston Bees/Braves, between 1933 and 1945; longtime minor-league manager.
August 22 – George Cutshaw, 86, shortstop for the Brooklyn Dodgers/Superbas/Robins (1912–1917), Pittsburgh Pirates (1918–1921) and Detroit Tigers (1922–1923) who excelled on defense.
August 27 – Herman Layne, 72, outfielder and pinch runner who appeared in 11 games for the 1927 Pirates

September
September 5 – Chick Davies, 81, pitcher in 46 MLB career games for 1914–1915 Philadelphia Athletics and 1925–1926 New York Giants.
September 5 – Jack Fournier, 83, first baseman who played 1,530 games for five teams—principally the Chicago White Sox, Brooklyn Robins and St. Louis Cardinals—in 15 seasons spanning 1912 to 1927; hit .313 lifetime and led NL in homers (with 27) in 1924.
September 10 – Roy Johnson, 70, one of few ballplayers associated with Native American descent in the pre-World War II era, like his younger brother Bob Johnson, as well as one of the most fearing outfielders in Pacific Coast League history, who later played in Major League Baseball for the Detroit Tigers, Boston Red Sox, New York Yankees and Boston Bees in a span of ten seasons from 1929 to 1938, leading the American League in at-bats (640) and doubles (45) in a rookie season where he amassed 201 hits, and later with 19 triples in 1931, compiling at least a .314 batting average in four seasons and 100 or more runs three times, while leading the 1933 Red Sox in average, home runs and RBI and earning a World Series ring with the Yankees in 1936.
September 11 – Del Baker, 81, catcher (1914–1916), coach (1933–1938) and manager (1938–1942) of the Detroit Tigers, who led them to the 1940 AL pennant and an overall 416–354 (.540) record as skipper; later coached for Cleveland Indians and Boston Red Sox, and served as interim manager of 1960 Red Sox.
September 12 – Bernie Boland, 81, pitcher for the 1915–1920 Tigers and the 1921 St. Louis Browns; reached double figures in games won from 1915–1919.
September 13 – Vince Barton, 65, Canadian outfielder who appeared in 102 games for the Chicago Cubs during the 1931 and 1932 seasons.
September 13 – John MacLean, 52, play-by-play announcer and member of the Washington Senators' broadcast team from 1961 to 1968, then briefly #2 announcer on Boston Red Sox' radio network in 1972.
September 13 – Johnny McCarthy, 63, first baseman who played 542 career games for Brooklyn Dodgers (1934–1935), New York Giants (1936–1941 and 1948) and Boston Braves (1943 and 1946).
September 14 – René Monteagudo, 57, Cuban pitcher–outfielder for the Washington Senators (1938, 1940, 1944) and Philadelphia Phillies (1945).
September 14 – Sloppy Thurston, 74, pitcher who won 89 games over nine seasons between 1923 and 1933 for St. Louis, Chicago and Washington of the American League, and Brooklyn of the National League.
September 15 – Felton Wilson, 65, catcher who played for the Negro leagues' Cleveland Stars, Akron Grays and Detroit Stars during the 1930s.
September 16 – Tom Long, 75, southpaw hurler who appeared in one MLB game, on April 26, 1924, for the Brooklyn Robins.
September 18 – Dave Harris, 73, outfielder (primarily a reserve) who appeared in 542 career games over seven seasons with the Boston Braves, Chicago White Sox and Washington Senators between 1925 and 1934.
September 18 – Doug Smith, 81, pitcher for the 1912 Boston Red Sox.
September 20 – Jim Bishop, 75, pitcher who went 0–4 (6.39) in 22 games for 1923–1924 Philadelphia Phillies.
September 23 – Jesse Fowler, 73, left-handed hurler who appeared in 13 games for the 1924 St. Louis Cardinals; elder brother, by over 23 years, of Art Fowler.
September 24 – Tommy Nelson, 56, third baseman who played 40 games for 1945 Boston Braves.
September 24 – Bruce Sloan, 58, backup outfielder who appeared in 59 games for 1944 New York Giants.
September 30 – Reb Russell, 84, southpaw pitcher for the 1913–1919 Chicago White Sox who won 22 games as a rookie and 18 more in 1916; member of 1917 World Series champions but released due to a sore arm in June 1919; became an outfielder and returned to the majors for the 1922–1923 Pittsburgh Pirates, batting .323 with 165 hits in 154 games spanning those two seasons.

October
October 8 – Raymond Haley, 82, caught from 1915 through 1917 for the Boston Red Sox and Philadelphia Athletics.
October 12 – Jim Mattox, 76, left-handed-hitting catcher and pinch hitter who appeared in 51 games for the 1922–1923 Pittsburgh Pirates.
October 13 – Icehouse Wilson, 61, college football star (Saint Mary's of California) whose one season of pro baseball (1934) included one game and one at bat as a pinch hitter for the Detroit Tigers on May 31.
October 22 – Ben Van Dyke, 85, pitcher for the Philadelphia Phillies (1909) and Boston Red Sox (1912).
October 24 – Al Brazle, 60, pitcher who won 97 games for the St. Louis Cardinals (1943 and 1946–1954), also leading the NL in saves twice; 1946 World Series champion.
October 27 – Bennie Tate, 71, lefty-swinging platoon catcher for the Washington Senators, Chicago White Sox, Boston Red Sox and Chicago Cubs who played in 566 games between 1924 and 1934; member of Washington's 1924 World Series champions.
October 27 – Eddie Yount, 57, outfielder and pinch hitter who got into nine total games in brief MLB trials with the 1937 Philadelphia Athletics and 1939 Pittsburgh Pirates.

November
November 2 – Greasy Neale, 81, outfielder who played 768 games for the Cincinnati Reds and Philadelphia Phillies between 1916 and 1924; batted .357 in 1919 World Series to help Reds win world title; gained fame as a football coach, leading the Philadelphia Eagles to two NFL championships during the 1940s to crown a career he began to fill time between baseball seasons.
November 3 – Harry Kenyon, 79, outfielder, pitcher and manager in the Negro leagues between 1921 and 1929.
November 8 – Bob Chipman, 55, pitcher who spent all or part of 12 years in the National League (1941–1952) with Brooklyn, Chicago and Boston, appearing in 293 games.
November 10 – Denver Grigsby, 72, outfielder who played 199 games for 1923–1925 Chicago Cubs.
November 14 – Gene Bailey, 79, outfielder in 213 games for four big-league clubs, principally the Brooklyn Robins, over five seasons between 1917 and 1924.
November 15 – Phil Todt, 72, fine defensive first baseman who played from 1924 to 1931 for the Boston Red Sox and Philadelphia Athletics.
November 22 – T. J. Brown, 58, All-Star shortstop in the Negro leagues who played from 1939 to 1950, principally for the Memphis Red Sox. 
November 23 – Willie Mitchell, 83, southpaw hurler who pitched in 276 games for the Cleveland Naps/Indians and Detroit Tigers from 1901 to 1919.
November 27 – Ed Holly, 94, shortstop who appeared in 276 games for the 1906–1907 St. Louis Cardinals and 1914–1915 Pittsburgh Rebels (Federal League).
November 27 – Nate Moreland, 59, pitcher/outfielder for the Baltimore Elite Giants of the Negro National League during the 1940s.
November 29 – Tom Hamilton, 48, outfielder who played in 67 games for the 1952–1953 Philadelphia Athletics; later a minor league manager and college baseball coach.
November 30 – Alex Metzler, 70, outfielder who hit .285 with a .374 OBP in 560 games for the Philadelphia Athletics, Chicago Cubs, Chicago White Sox, and St. Louis Browns from 1925 to 1930.

December
December 1 – Kyle "Skinny" Graham, 74, pitcher who appeared in 67 career games for the 1924–1926 Boston Braves and 1929 Detroit Tigers.
December 3 – Bill Holland, 72, pitcher/outfielder who appeared in 15 seasons in the Negro leagues between 1920 and 1941.
December 3 – James Mulvey, 74, motion picture industry executive and co-owner (with his wife, Dearie, until her 1968 death) of the Brooklyn/Los Angeles Dodgers from 1938 until his death.
December 4 – Frank Duncan, 72, topflight defensive catcher whose playing career in the Negro leagues encompassed 22 seasons spanning 1920 to 1945.
December 5 – Spencer Pumpelly, 80, Yale graduate who appeared in one inning as a Washington Senators' relief pitcher in his only MLB appearance on July 11, 1925.
December 10 – Joe Riggert, 86, outfielder for four seasons in the major leagues; holds the record for career minor league triples.

References